"Dub Be Good to Me" is a song by British dub group Beats International featuring singer Lindy Layton, released on 24 January 1990 as the first single from their debut album, Let Them Eat Bingo (1990). It was written by frontman Norman Cook and interprets the SOS Band's 1983 hit "Just Be Good to Me", which it is named after. It also samples the songs "The Guns of Brixton" by the Clash, the Once Upon a Time in the West theme by Ennio Morricone, and "Jam Hot" by Johnny Dynell.

"Dub Be Good to Me" was a number-one hit in the United Kingdom and Israel and also reached number one on the US Billboard Hot Dance Club Play chart. MTV Dance ranked the song at number 59 on their list of "The 100 Biggest 90's Dance Anthems of All Time" in 2011.

Production
Written by Norman Cook (aka Fatboy Slim), "Dub Be Good to Me" was the sole number one single for Cook's outfit Beats International.

The track started out as an instrumental with the title "The Invasion of the Estate Agents". While also included as the B-side to this single, it originally appeared as the B-side to Cook's 1989 single "For Spacious Lies". This instrumental track is heavily based on the bassline from The Clash's "Guns of Brixton", with a sample of the distinctive "harmonica" theme from the epic western film Once Upon a Time in the West, written by Ennio Morricone. This instrumental, in slightly remixed form, had vocals added from The SOS Band's "Just Be Good to Me" (as re-recorded by Lindy Layton) to form "Dub Be Good to Me". Cook told in an interview:

It was Lindy's idea to do a cover of the S.O.S. Band's 1984 hit 'Just Be Good To Me'. I knew it would go well with other beats because I'd tried it as a DJ. I used the bassline from The Clash song 'Guns Of Brixton', which was me tipping my hat to The Clash as I was such a big fan. I also wanted to do something slower than the current house music, yet something funky you could get into.

The song features the distinctive vocals of David John-Baptiste, more commonly known as DJ Deejay or just DJ. The opening and closing line "tank fly boss walk jam nitty gritty you're listening to the boy from the big bad city, this is jam hot, this is jam hot" was from Johnny Dynell's 1983 hit "Jam Hot", and the drum track is a loop of the oft-sampled break from "God Make Me Funky" by The Headhunters.

Chart performance
The song spent four weeks at number-one on the UK Singles Chart in March 1990. It was the seventh best-selling single of 1990 in the UK. The single also made it to the top 10 in Austria (number two), Belgium, Greece (number two), Ireland, the Netherlands (number two), Norway, Spain, Sweden, Switzerland, and West Germany. Additionally, it was a top-20 hit in France, and top-30 hit in Italy. On the Eurochart Hot 100, "Dub Be Good to Me" reached number three in March 1990. In the US, it peaked at number-one on the Billboard Hot Dance Club Play chart and number 76 on the Billboard Hot 100. In Israel, the single reached number one, while in New Zealand and Australia, it reached numbers six and 12, respectively.

Critical reception
Bill Coleman from Billboard described the song as a "reggae-fied, Soul II Soul-tinged reworking", adding that "big on import, stateside release sports the new remixes. Only misgiving is absence of fab original." Ernest Heardy from Cash Box wrote that this brainchild of Norman Cook "revamps" "Just Be Good to Me" "into a shoulderswaying, hip-swinging groove that never lets up." Dave Sholin from the Gavin Report noted that Cook from the Housemartins takes this 1983 track by the SOS Band, "beats and mixes well, and what emerges is a fresh delicacy for now tastes." He concluded, "Charts #1 in England and there's no reason to doubt it'll have a real good run in the States, too." Simon Reynolds from Melody Maker remarked that "the heartquake synths of the original [are] replaced by sonar bleeps, ocean bed alarums, lugubrious horns and a lonesome, Midnight Cowboy harmonica. Just fine." 

Upon the album release, another editor, Andrew Smith, wrote, "Out of this was fashioned a languid, smirking, gem of a tune, which we're probably all sick of by now. It nevertheless constitutes one of the finest shagging records ever made, proving once again that Norman Cook is a clever chap who knows a good bassline and how to filch it." Pan-European magazine Music & Media described it as an "appealing mixture of house and reggae", complimenting "good vocals by Lindy and some tasteful blues harmonica." David Giles from Music Week stated, "Possibly Norman Cook's finest moment since leaving the Housemartins." Frank Owen from Spin declared it as "an exquisite cover", adding further "Beats International has the distinctive languid air of lovers rock. A classy and pertinent fusion, "Dub Be Good to Me" is similar in execution to the recent British import "Wishing on a Star" by Fresh Four, featuring Lizz E. That bombed in this country, and so will this probably."

Retrospective response
AllMusic editor Rick Anderson noted that on "Dub Be Good to Me", the bassline from "Guns of Brixton" is "churning underneath an otherwise relatively faithful rendition" of the SOS Band's "Just Be Good to Me". Writing in Freaky Trigger in 1999, Tom Ewing ranked the song as the 97th best single of the 1990s, and described it as "the Wild Bunch/Massive Attack dub-dance Bristol sound, commercialised before it had even come close to breaking through." Revisiting the single in 2010, he noted "the latent cheekiness of the track – its lifts so flagrant, its components so random – gives it a warmth, a sense of reassurance that despite Layton's desperation everything in Beats International's world is going to be alright." 

The Smith & Mighty Remix was included in Pitchfork Media's 2010 list of "twenty-five great remixes" of the 1990s.

Accolades

(*) indicates the list is unordered.

Track listings
 7-inch single
 "Dub Be Good to Me" (edit)
 "Invasion of the Estate Agents"

 12-inch single
 "Dub Be Good to Me" (featuring Lindy Layton) (full length)
 "Just Be Good To Me (a cappella)"
 "Invasion of the Freestyle: Discuss" (featuring RPM)
 "Invasion of the Estate Agents"

Charts

Weekly charts

Year-end charts

Certifications

Cover versions

"Dub Be Good to Me" was covered in 2002 by Faithless and Dido for the album NME & Warchild Presents 1 Love.

Jack Peñate covered "Dub Be Good to Me" as a B-side to his re-released single "Second, Minute or Hour" in September 2007.

Rapper Professor Green and Lily Allen released their version of the song, titled "Just Be Good to Green".

British band The Ting Tings covered "Dub Be Good to Me" on BBC Radio 1's Live Lounge.

British Urban duo MK1 performed the song during the judges' houses stage of the ninth series of The X Factor.

See also
 List of number-one dance hits (United States)

References

1990 debut singles
1990 songs
Beats International songs
Go! Beat singles
Number-one singles in Israel
Songs written by Norman Cook
UK Singles Chart number-one singles
Mashup songs